Century High School is located in Ullin, Illinois.
It Combines the small towns of Karnak, Illinois, New Grand Chain, Illinois, Ullin, Illinois, Perks, Illinois, and Wetaug, Illinois into one school in Pulaski county. Mound City, Illinois is not involved in the School District, but is in the same county, Pulaski County, Illinois.

References

Schools in Pulaski County, Illinois
Public high schools in Illinois
Ullin, Illinois